Pamela is a series of twelve paintings by the English artist Joseph Highmore, produced between 1741 and 1743 as the basis for a set of prints. They are free adaptations of scenes from the novel Pamela, or Virtue Rewarded by Samuel Richardson. They are now divided equally between the National Gallery of Victoria, the Fitzwilliam Museum and Tate Britain.

History

The book was already a popular one for painters - the younger artist Francis Hayman had produced designs for Gravelot's engravings for the 1742 edition as well as a pair of scenes from the novel for Vauxhall Gardens, also around 1742 (one is lost and the other is now in the National Trust's collections at Sizergh Castle). Highmore painted his own series of twelve works between 1741 and 1743 and on 16 February 1744 advertised that ten of them were ready to be viewed at his studio, with another advertisement on 10 May announcing that all twelve paintings in the set were complete. The first advertisement also stated he was taking subscriptions for a set of twelve engravings after the novel — Highmore had Louis Truchy and Antoine Benoist produce them.

The series bears comparison with William Hogarth's contemporary series such as Marriage A-la-Mode, A Rake's Progress and A Harlot's Progress, also painted for the print market, but it differs from them in that they derive from a concrete literary source rather than the artist's own plot-lines. Art historians see the Pamela series as placing Highmore alongside Hogarth and Hayman as "one of the initiators of a British school of narrative painting". Though Highmore's paintings were intended as treatments of scenes from the novel rather than strictly as illustrations, Highmore and Richardson became close friends, with the former painting the latter's portrait as well as a scene from his later novel Clarissa.

The whole series of twelve paintings was still in Highmore's studio in 1750 and when he moved to Canterbury in 1762 he sold all twelve together as a set. They then re-appeared on 26 November 1920, when they were sold from the collection of Hugh McCalmont's son Major Dermot McCalmont (1887-1968) of Cheveley Park, Cambridgeshire to a man named Peacock, who was acting on behalf of the art dealer and restorer Ayerst Horace Buttery. The National Gallery used money from the Florence Fund to buy the whole set from Buttery and then divided the twelve works equally between itself, the Fitzwilliam Museum and the National Gallery of Victoria (NGV) in Melbourne. Each of the other two institutions contributed £500, the Fitzwilliam from the Marlay Fund and the NGV from the Felton Bequest.

The NGV's interest had been piqued by the fact that some of Highmore's works were already in Australia, brought there by Highmore's grandson - in 1947 a number of those works later also ended up in the NGV, most notably his 1745-47 self-portrait. The NGV's four works from the Pamela series were first exhibited on 10 May 1921, with one local newspaper remarking that they "tell their story dramatically and, though the drawing is occasionally weak, the figures have a certain feeling of life and vitality that renders them interesting from the illustrative point of view". The four works which remained in the National Gallery were transferred from there to the National Gallery of British Art (now Tate Britain) in 1934 and the twelve works were last reunited in 1963 at Kenwood House.

List

References

1743 paintings
Paintings in the collection of the National Gallery of Victoria
Collection of the Tate galleries
Paintings in the collection of the Fitzwilliam Museum